Robert John Armstrong, (November 17, 1884 – January 14, 1957) was an American prelate of the Roman Catholic Church.  He served as the fourth Bishop of the Diocese of Sacramento in California from 1929 until his death in 1957.

Armstrong served during the Great Depression, World War II, the Korean War and the Vietnam War.

Biography

Early life
Robert Armstrong was born on December 10, 1910, in San Francisco, California. His family later moved to Washington State.  He studied at Gonzaga University in Seattle, graduating in 1904, and the Grand Seminary of Montreal in Montréal, Quebec.

Priesthood 
Armstrong was ordained a priest for the Diocese of Seattle on December 10, 1910.  He served as a curate in Spokane and was pastor of St. Paul's Parish in Yakima, Washington from 1914 to 1929.

Armstrong would later be transferred to the Diocese of Spokane where he eventually became the assistant pastor at Our Lady of Lourdes Cathedral Parish . He was "inducted into the order" of the Knights of Columbus and became a chaplain of the order.  Armstrong spent 15 years in Yakima and was known as "Father Bob".

Bishop of Sacramento
On January 4, 1929, Pope Pius XI named Armstrong the fourth bishop of the Diocese of Sacramento.  He was consecrated a bishop on March 12, 1929, by Bishop Edward O'Dea.  The co-consecrators were Bishops Mathias Lenihan and Joseph McGrath.

During the week of August 2, 1930, Captain Michael Riordan and Armstrong hosted a lay retreat for men from the Ancient Order of Hibernians and the Sacramento Valley region at a Jesuit retreat center near Los Altos, California. On August 29, 1932, Armstrong gave a short address to the Veterans of Foreign Wars convention at the Sacramento Memorial Auditorium.

On January 8, 1935, Armstrong gave the benediction at the inauguration of Governor Frank Merriam.On December 13, 1936, Armstrong travelled to Sacred Heart Parish in Gridley, California to establish a men's Holy Name Society. The bishop preached that its purpose was for "each man to labor for the glory of God's name."

On April 8, 1940, Armstrong was the concluding speaker at a three-day Catholic Confraternity of Christian Doctrine convention in Portland, Oregon. He postulated that religion "cannot enter our public schools and pupils think it of little importance when it cannot be taught as other subjects."

Armstrong led his ecclesial community through the Great Depression and World War II while becoming known for his casual and approachable manner.  He became involved in government and legislative issues that affected Catholics.  He institutionalized social work within the see and upgraded its Catholic school system.  By 1957 there were 209,281 Catholics in the diocese, a 255% increase from 1940.  Armstrong established over 28 new parishes. At his death, the diocese encompassed 36 Northern California counties.

On April 14, 1942, Armstrong returned to Spokane to celebrate a pontifical requiem Mass for his mother, Margaret Armstrong, who died at age 80. She was a member of the St. Aloysius altar society.

Death and legacy 
Armstrong's health declined in 1954.  On October 26, 1955, Pope Pius XII named Bishop Joseph McGucken as coadjutor bishop with the right of succession.  Robert Armstrong died in Sacramento on January 1957.

See also
 Historical list of the Catholic bishops of the United States
 List of the Catholic bishops of the United States

Sources
 Roman Catholic Diocese of Sacramento Retrieved 2010-05-20.
 
 The Hierarchy of the Catholic Church Retrieved 2010-05-20.

References

Episcopal succession

1884 births
1957 deaths
People from San Francisco
Gonzaga University alumni
Roman Catholic Diocese of Spokane
Roman Catholic bishops of Sacramento
20th-century Roman Catholic bishops in the United States
Religious leaders from Washington (state)